is one of the most popular mountains around Hiroshima, Japan. It is part of the Setonaikai National Park.

Mount Misen is famous for mountain climbing, trekking, camping and sakura, camellia, hydrangea, autumn leaves and maples and sunset view.

References

External links
 Goto Noro-san! 
 Kure Navi 

Noro
Kure, Hiroshima